Kjell-Ole Haune (born 1976 in Norway) is a composer and producer.
He is best known for composing and producing Terje Vigen-The Musical, which is based on a poem by Henrik Ibsen, and the musical TONIGHT, for which he wrote the story, lyrics and music. He is the first Norwegian composer to have two of his own musicals produced in London's West End.
He has also produced the book Terje Vigen, which is the first publication of this poem by Henrik Ibsen in English and German, (Published by Fagbokforlaget).
The English translation is by John Northam with German translation by Odd Jensen.

Biography
Haune was born in Norway on 29 March 1976, in Oslo. He started his musical career at the age of five when he joined
St. Johannesguttene (boys choir) as the youngest to be recruited by musical director and operasinger Svein Brun. At the age of 7 he started taking piano lessons an at the age of 10 he joined the local School Marching Band, Snarøya Skoles Musikkorps, where he learnt to play the baritone and later the drums, the last to become his main instrument.

He was one of the first Norwegian students to enter and later graduate from Liverpool Institute of Performing Arts, (LIPA) founded by Sir Paul McCartney.

TONIGHT The Musical
In 2000, at the age of 24, he produced his first musical TONIGHT in London's West End, at the Peacock Theatre. (Haune had written the story, lyrics and music). The musical was later staged in Oslo Concert Hall where the music was performed by Kringkastningsorkestret (The National Radio Symphony Orchestra). The performance was broadcast by NRK Radio.

Terje Vigen The Musical
In 2006, as part of the 100th anniversary for Henrik Ibsen, Haune composed music to Ibsen's poem "Terje Vigen" and turned it into a multimedia musical. He was also responsible for producing the film for Terje Vigen together with film producer Bjørnar Fjeldvær and Randi-Margrethe Haune. Terje Vigen has been on tour in Norway, and has also been performed in San Francisco in USA. In 2008, Terje Vigen the musical was staged at the Arts Theatre in London's West End. A CD was recorded in 2006 starring Rein Alexander.

Other activities
Haune has written songs for various artists, and has been invited to perform for royal families. In 2007 he received a gold award for creating the most successful song for radio commercial in Norway. He has also been a guest lecturer at London School of Economics.

Personal life
Kjell-Ole was the first born son to Kjell Haune (father) and Snefrid Irene Haune (mother). He has one sister; Monica Christine Haune. K-O Haune moved to Liverpool, England, UK in 1996. From 2000 - 2017 Haune lived in Notting Hill, in London. He married Randi-Margrethe Eliasen in 2005, and had three children, Michelle Josephine Haune, Madeleine Angelina Haune and Maximillian William Henry Haune. In 2017 they moved back to Norway. They divorced in 2018. Haune is currently living in Fredrikstad, Norway and is now in a relationship with Annette Eri Norevik.

Bibliography
 Terje Vigen by Henrik Ibsen. KOH Ltd, London 2006

References
 Aftenposten Article about TONIGHT The Musical  Retrieved 25.10.2000
 VG News Paper Article about TONIGHT Retrieved 22.10.2000
 ibsen.nb.no - Terje Vigen The Musical Retrieved 05.08.2005
 Terje Vigen - The Book Retrieved 2006
 Terje Vigen Article   Retrieved 24.08.2007
 Terje Vigen to San Francisco Retrieved April 2007
 Kjell-Ole Haune  Retrieved 2009
 Terje Vigen to London's West End Retrieved 12.06.2008
 Terje Vigen by Henrik Ibsen Retrieved 2009
 TONIGHT The Musical at Oslo Concert Hall in Norway Retrieved 27.08.2002
 Kjell-Ole Haune in Northern Light Retrieved Jan.2004
 Terje Vigen Article Retrieved 09.11.2005
 Terje Vigen goes to California Retrieved 05.05.2007
 Terje Vigen the Musical - Article Retrieved 07.08.2007
 Musikalisher Terje Vigen Retrieved 23.08.2005

1976 births
Living people
Norwegian composers
Norwegian male composers
Alumni of the Liverpool Institute for Performing Arts